Austria competed at the 1988 Summer Paralympics in Seoul, South Korea. 43 competitors from Austria won 35 medals including 13 gold, 7 silver and 15 bronze and finished 20th in the medal table.

See also 
 Austria at the Paralympics
 Austria at the 1988 Summer Olympics

References 

Austria at the Paralympics
1988 in Austrian sport
Nations at the 1988 Summer Paralympics